= Results of the 1872 Canadian federal election =

1872 Canadian federal election

== Results by Province ==
=== British Columbia ===
Results in British Columbia
Party	Seats	Second	Third	Votes	%	+/-
Liberals	1	1	0	800	83.68	
Unknown	0	1	1	113	11.82	
Conservative	1	0	0	43	4.5	
Liberal–Conservative	3	0	0	0	0	
Total	5			956	100.0	

=== Manitoba ===
Results in Manitoba
Party	Seats	Second	Third	Fourth	Votes	%	+/-
Liberals	1	0	1	0	464	35.56	
Conservative	1	1	0	0	388	29.73	
Independent Conservative	1	0	0	0	258	19.77	
Unknown	0	2	0	1	195	14.94	
Liberal–Conservative	1	0	0	0	0	0	
Total	4				1,305	100.0	

=== New Brunswick ===
Results in New Brunswick
Party	Seats	Second	Third	Fourth	Votes	%	+/-
Liberals	8	3	0	0	11,702	46.85	
Unknown	0	6	4	1	6,720	26.9	
Liberal–Conservative	3	0	0	0	4,457	17.84	
Conservative	2	0	0	0	2,100	8.41	
Independent Liberal	1	0	0	0	0	0	
Independent	1	0	0	0	0	0	
Total	15				24,979	100.0	

=== Nova Scotia ===
Results in Nova Scotia
Party	Seats	Second	Third	Fourth	Votes	%	+/-
Liberals	7	1	1	0	11,202	28.07	
Conservative	5	3	0	0	9,399	23.55	
Liberal–Conservative	6	1	1	1	7,902	19.8	
Unknown	0	6	0	1	6,528	16.36	
Independent Liberal	0	0	1	0	2,452	6.14	
Independent	0	0	0	1	2,430	6.09	
Total	18				39,913	100.0	

=== Ontario ===
Results in Ontario
Party	Seats	Second	Third	Fourth	Votes	%	+/-
Liberals	48	7	1	1	57,990	35.67	
Conservative	25	15	0	0	42,322	26.03	
Unknown	0	41	3	1	37,340	22.97	
Liberal–Conservative	12	6	1	0	19,400	11.93	
Independent Liberal	1	1	0	0	2,780	1.71	
Conservative-Labour	0	1	0	0	1,422	0.87	
Independent	0	1	0	0	1,308	0.8	
Total	86				162,562	100.0	

=== Quebec ===
Results in Quebec
Party	Seats	Second	Third	Fourth	Votes	%	+/-
Liberals	26	3	1	0	27,935	31.52	
Conservative	25	14	0	0	27,871	31.45	
Unknown	0	25	3	1	18,130	20.46	
Liberal–Conservative	12	2	0	0	10,290	11.61	
Independent	1	1	0	0	2,439	2.75	
Independent Conservative	1	1	0	0	1,962	2.21	
Total	65				88,627	100.0	
